Los Juglares del D.EX.A are a Panamanian folk music group representing the University of Panama, founded in 1971 to preserve Panamanian traditional music.  The group's foundation was coordinated by Juan Andrés Castillo, a mejoranero; other founding members included violinists Escolastico "Colasco" Cortes and Miguel Leguizamo Sr.

Second generation members

Miguel Leguizamo: violin
Nicolas Aceves Núñez: Recognized Composer in Panama, book author, professional accordionist, philanthropist, music director, music teacher and  professional accordion repair technician.

Tonita Rudas: mejoranero
Victor Ruiz: percussion
Ricaurte Villareal: percussion
Raul Vital: singer and churuquero

2015 Los Juglars Members now known as Orchestra of folkloric Music:

Nicolas Aceves Nunez : Composer, book author, professional accordionist, music director and accordion teacher with The University of Panama,  Panama, Central America. Members are as follows:  
Efraín González:  guitar and violin
Eric Duviel Vargas: mejoranero
Hipólito Alvarado,  churuquero
Ricaurte Villareal: percussion (tambor)
Daniel Guardado: percussion (Caja)
Carlos Castor: singer

References

Panamanian musical groups